Svetlana or Svitlana Zakharova may refer to:
Svetlana Zakharova (athlete) (born 1970), Russian long-distance runner
Svetlana Zakharova (dancer) (born 1979), Russian ballerina
Svitlana Zakharova (singer) (born 1987), Ukrainian singer-songwriter